Gulripshi District is a district of Abkhazia, one of Georgia’s breakaway republics. It corresponds to the eponymous Georgian district. Its capital is Gulripshi, the town by the same name. Until the August 2008 Battle of the Kodori Valley, the north-eastern part of Gulripshi district was part of Upper Abkhazia, the corner of Abkhazia controlled by Georgia until the Battle of the Kodori Valley during the August 2008 South Ossetia War. Upper Abkhazia was home to 1,956 of the district's 19,918 inhabitants, most of whom were ethnic Svans (a subgroup of the Georgian people). Most of these fled before the battle and have not yet returned.

Of note is the Dranda Cathedral sitting over a shrine built by Justinian in 551. The medieval principality of Dal-Tsabal was centered in the district. Abkhazia's main airport, Sukhumi Dranda Airport, is also located in Gulripshi district.

Administration

Adgur Kharazia was reappointed as Administration Head on 10 May 2001 following the March 2001 local elections.

On 18 December 2002, President Ardzinba released Kharazia as Administration Head and appointed him as Minister for Agriculture and Food.

On 16 June 2003, President Ardzinba appointed Tamaz Gogia as Administration Head. In the beginning of 2004, district officials stayed away from work in protest of what they perceived as rudeness from Gogia. In response, Gogia applied for resignation which President Ardzinba granted on 9 February, appointing First Deputy Head Aslan Baratelia as acting Head.

On 24 March 2005, newly elected President Sergei Bagapsh replaced Administration Head Aslan Baratelia with Mikhail Logua. In the 2011 Presidential election, Logua successfully ran for Vice President alongside Alexander Ankvab. He was succeeded on 14 December by Timur Eshba, who had previously been Deputy Head.

Following the May 2014 Revolution and the election of Raul Khajimba as President, on 23 September 2014 he replaced Eshba with Aslan Baratelia.

List of Administration Heads

Demographics
At the time of the 2011 census, the population of the district was 18 032 people, consisting of:
 Armenians (46.8%)
 Abkhazians (33.6%)
 Russians (11.4%)
 Georgians (4.6%)
 Ukrainians (0.9%)
 Greeks (0.7%)

Settlements
The district's main settlements are:
Gulripshi
Tsebelda
Dranda
Babushera
Chkhalta (the main village of what used to be Upper Abkhazia)

See also
Kodori Valley

References

 
Districts of Abkhazia
Districts of Georgia (country)